Victor J. Barnett (born 1933) is a British-American businessman, former executive chairman of Burberry, and member of the Wolfson family.

Early life and education
Victor Jules Barnett was born in London, England, in 1933 to Esmond Barnett and Edith Wolfson Barnett. His father died young, leaving Barnett to be raised by his mother and her siblings, among them Sir Isaac Wolfson. Moving to New York City after World War II, Barnett graduated from the Horace Mann School and with a bachelor's degree in economics from the Wharton School of Business at the University of Pennsylvania.

Career
Barnett began his career managing what was then the fledgling American operation of Burberry, a subsidiary of his family's retail conglomerate Great Universal Stores (GUS). He joined Revlon, Inc. in 1961, serving as executive vice president under Charles Revson until 1976. Barnett then returned to help manage the family business, GUS, joining his cousins Leonard and David Wolfson on the group's board of directors and executive committee. As head of GUS in North America, Barnett led the acquisition and growth of credit agency Experian in 1996. He also became executive chairman of Burberry in 1997. At Burberry, Barnett led a reorganization of the company, hiring Rose Marie Bravo as chief executive, renegotiating deals with Burberry's Japanese licensees, acquiring their licensee in Spain, and driving major real estate purchases including its flagship stores on New Bond Street and East 57th Street. Over Barnett's tenure Burberry's operating profits more than quadrupled and the brand became recognized as a global luxury fashion house. The corporate turnaround and brand restoration is still widely studied through a case analysis created by Harvard Business School in 2003. The family took Burberry public in 2002, and demerged GUS into Home Retail Group and Experian in 2006. Following his retirement from GUS and Burberry, Barnett bought pharmaceutical company Shaklee with his younger son Roger and joined the board of Grey Global Group.

Personal life
Barnett is married to Helaine M. Barnett, a prominent legal aid attorney and former president of the Legal Services Corporation. They have two sons, Craig Edward and Roger Lawrence. Craig Barnett, an investment banker, was married to Jennifer Peck, a daughter of Barbara and Stephen M. Peck. They divorced. Roger Barnett, CEO of Shaklee, is married to Sloan Lindemann Barnett, a daughter of Frayda and George Lindemann. Barnett is a former president of Fifth Avenue Synagogue and an emeritus director of the Charles H. Revson Foundation.

See also
 Leonard Wolfson, Baron Wolfson, his cousin 
 David Wolfson, Baron Wolfson of Sunningdale, his cousin

References

1933 births
Living people
Wharton School of the University of Pennsylvania alumni
20th-century American Jews
Charles H. Revson Foundation
Horace Mann School alumni
Burberry people
21st-century American Jews